McConnell's Windmill, also known as Morristown Windmill and Stone Windmill, is a stone windmill in Morristown, New York.  It was built in 1825, and is a coursed rubble stone structure measuring 40 feet tall and 77 feet in circumference.  It was used as a grist mill.  The building has been used as a jail and as an Air Warning System Observation Post (N. 69 c) during World War II.  It is the only windmill on the American side of the St. Lawrence Valley.

It was listed on the National Register of Historic Places in 1982.

References

External links
 Morristown Windmill - county tourism information

Windmills in New York (state)
Grinding mills in New York (state)
Grinding mills on the National Register of Historic Places in New York (state)
Industrial buildings completed in 1825
Buildings and structures in St. Lawrence County, New York
National Register of Historic Places in St. Lawrence County, New York
1825 establishments in New York (state)
Windmills on the National Register of Historic Places